Trachis, and Trachis Phocica (Τραχίς ἡ Φωκική) to distinguish it from the Trachis in Malis, was a small city of ancient Phocis, situated upon the confines of Boeotia, and on the road to Lebadeia.

References

Populated places in ancient Phocis
Former populated places in Greece
Lost ancient cities and towns